Allium paepalanthoides is a plant species native to China. It has been reported from Henan, Inner Mongolia, Shaanxi, Shanxi and Sichuan at elevations of 1400–2000 m.

Allium paepalanthoides produces a single narrow bulb up to 15 mm across. Scape is up to 50 cm tall. Leaves lance-linear, tapering at the tip, up to 25 mm wide at the widest point. Umbels with many flowers; tepals white with green midveins.

References

paepalanthoides
Onions
Flora of China
Plants described in 1931